Ajay Devgn (born 2 April 1969) is an Indian actor, film producer and director who appears in Bollywood films. He has received 32 awards, including four National Film Awards, four Filmfare Awards, one Zee Cine Award and four awards each from Screen and Stardust awards ceremonies.

Devgn made his acting debut in 1991 with a leading role in Phool Aur Kaante, for which he garnered the Filmfare Award for Best Male Debut. In 1995, Devgn starred in action-drama Naajayaz for which he received a nomination for Filmfare Award for Best Actor. For his portrayal of his role in the 1998 political drama film Zakhm, he was awarded the first National Film Award for Best Actor, Screen Award for Best Actor, Bollywood Movie Award for Besr Actor (Critics) and a BFJA Award for Best Actor, in addition to a Filmfare Award for Best Actor nomination. For his role as a traditional Indian man in 1999 romantic drama Hum Dil De Chuke Sanam he earned a third nomination for the Filmfare Award for Best Actor.

In 2002, he starred in the biopic historical film The Legend of Bhagat Singh for which his portrayal of Bhagat Singh earned him his second National Film Award for Best Actor and a Filmfare Award for Best Actor (Critics). His portrayal of a Mumbai Underworld-based gangster in 2002 crime drama Company garnered him a Filmfare Award for Best Actor (Critics), in addition to a Screen Award for Best Actor and a Stardust Award for Star of the Year – Male. His portrayal of a psychopath killer in 2002 thriller film Deewangee earned him the Filmfare Award for Best Villain, along with a Screen Award, Bollywood Movie Award and a Zee Cine Award for the same category. His comic portrayal of a troubled Goan man in the 2009 comedy film All the Best earned him a Stardust Award for Best Actor in Comic Role and an IIFA Award for Best Comedian nomination. For his portrayal of an upright police officer in the 2011 action thriller film Singham garnered him a Stardust Award for Best Actor in Thriller/Action category and nominations for Best Actor at Filmfare and IIFA awards.

In addition to acting awards, Devgn won other several awards including Rajiv Gandhi Awards for Achievement in Bollywood, Most Profitable Celebrity of 2010 at ETC Bollywood Business Awards, Jasarat Award, NDTV Actor of the Year and the Padma Shri awards for his contributions towards the industry.

National Film Awards
  
The National Film Awards are awarded by the Government of India's Directorate of Film Festivals division for achievements in the Indian film industry. Devgn has received four awards.

Filmfare Awards
Established in 1954, the Filmfare Awards are presented annually by The Times Group to members of the Hindi film industry. Devgn has won three awards.

Bengal Film Journalists' Association Awards
Bengal Film Journalists Association Awards is given by "The Bengal Film Journalists' Association" is the oldest Association of Film critics in India, founded in 1937. Devgn has received two awards.

Producers Guild Film Awards
The Producers Guild Film Awards (previously knows as Apsara Film & Television Producers Guild Awards) is an annual event originated by the Film Producers Guild of India. Devgn has received one award.

Zee Cine Awards
The Zee Cine Awards are an annual award ceremony organised by the Zee Entertainment Enterprises. Devgn has received one award.

BIG Star Entertainment Awards

Global Indian Film Awards

Stardust Awards

Screen Awards

References

External links 

Ajay Devgn
Lists of awards received by Indian actor